Hans Ulrich Staeps (1909–1988) was a German composer, music professor and professional recorder player. Staeps was born in Dortmund and was a professor at the Vienna Conservatory from 1940-1975. He was a prolific composer of recorder works, writing over 20 pieces for the instrument in a period of 30 years. Many of these compositions are works for recorder ensembles from 2 to 6 recorders, sometimes with piano, cembalo or guitar accompaniment. He also wrote songs, made transcriptions of classical works for recorder and wrote didactic books on player the recorder amongst others 

. Staeps was known to improvise his piano accompaniments, which often feature complex harmonies, with great ease.

References

1909 births
1988 deaths
German recorder players
20th-century classical composers
20th-century German composers
20th-century flautists